Lavandula lanata, the woolly lavender, is a species of flowering plant in the family Lamiaceae, native to southern Spain. The deep violet purple flowers are borne on narrow spikes, and give off the familiar lavender scent.

Lavandula lanata is cultivated in temperate zones for its attractive appearance and fragrance. It has gained the Royal Horticultural Society’s Award of Garden Merit.

References

lanata
Taxa named by Pierre Edmond Boissier
Flora of the Mediterranean Basin